}} 
| prevseason         = 2017–18
| nextseason         = 2019–20
}}
The 2018–19 season was Shirak's 28th consecutive season in the Armenian Premier League, in which they finished the season in 7th place, their worst positioning since the 2011 season. Shirak also took part in the Armenian Cup, where they were knocked out by Artsakh in the first round.

Squad

Transfers

In

Out

Released

Competitions

Premier League

Results summary

Results

Table

Armenian Cup

Statistics

Appearances and goals

|-
|colspan="14"|Players who left Shirak during the season:

|}

Goal scorers

Clean sheets

Disciplinary Record

References

Shirak SC seasons
Shirak